The following is a timeline of the history of the city of Douala, Cameroon.

Prior to 20th century

 1472 - the Portuguese visit the area during the Age of Exploration
 1845 - Alfred Saker of the British Baptist Missionary Society arrives in Douala.
 1849 - Native Baptist Church of Douala built.
 1859 (July 8) - Arrangement Anglo-douala signed.
 1868 - The company Woermann-Linie in Cameroon
 1881 - The company Woermann-Linie receives the authorization to build a factory (trading post) in Deido.
 1884 - Germans in power (the treaty between the Douala and Germans is signed; Cameroon becomes a German protectorate.
 1885 - Construction (1885-1890) of a prefabricate iron house for King Ndumbe Lobe.
 1886 - The Protestant Mission of Basel takes the place of the Mission of London.
 1887 (February) - Construction of the postoffice.
 1888
 (March)  - Construction of a school in Joss (directed by Théodor Christaller arrived in Cameroon in 1887).
 Construction of a brickyard (before, building materials were imported by Germans from Hamburg).
 Fracture between the Protestant Mission of Basel and the "Natives". Construction of a new church by the natives and led by Josua Dibundu.
 1890 - First documented plan of the city, Deutsches Kolonial Blatt.
 1891 - German government headquarters built.
 1893 - Revolt of the German troops composed of former slaves of Dahomey enrolled in the German army to pay back their liberation.
 1896 
 General Hospital built.
 The German Baptists Missioners of Berlin arrive in Cameroon.

20th century
 1901 - Kamerunstadt renamed "Douala."
 1905 - Palace of the Kings Bell built.
 1906 - Mwendi Ma Musango Baptist newspaper begins publication.
 1907 - Capital of German Cameroon relocated from Douala to Buea.
 1908 - Elolombe Ya Cameroun Protestant newspaper begins publication.
 1908 - Railway line sanctioned to run S.E. from Duala to the upper waters of the Nyong.
 1909 - The railway line Bonaberi-Nkongsamba (160 km) is inaugurated.
 1910
 Villa Mandessi Bell (residence) built.
 Robbery from Deutsch Westafrikanische Bank.
 Population: 22,000.
 1911 - The railway line Douala-Edea is inaugurated
 1913
 Eseka-Douala railway constructed.
 The German urban plan is implemented by moving the population to New Deido, New Akwa and New Bell and by creating a 1 km Freie Zone to separate those areas from the European city.
 1914
 September: British forces in Douala.
 New Bell established.
 1917 (February) Louis-Ferdinand Céline is hospitalized in Douala.
 1919 - Town becomes part of French Cameroun.
 1921 - Capital of French Cameroun relocated from Douala to Yaounde.
 1927 - Oryx Douala football club formed.
 1928 - Chamber of Commerce building constructed.
 1930 - Mbale newspaper begins publication.
 1931
 Palace of Justice built.
 Catholic Apostolic Prefecture of Douala established.
 1936 - Cathedral of Saints Peter and Paul, Douala built.
 1941 - Radio Douala begins broadcasting.
 1944 - Population: 37,751.
 1945 - Riots.
 1948 - Brasseries du Cameroun in business.
 1949
 Association des femmes de l'Union Francaise au Cameroun headquartered in Douala.
 Population: 67,925.
 1954 -  (bridge) built to Bonabéri.
 1955 - L'Effort Camerounais and La Presse du Cameroun newspapers begin publication.
 1956 - Population: 124,703.
 1957 - Union Douala football club formed.
 1958 - Stade Akwa built.
 1959 - 31 December: Unrest.
 1960 - 1 January: City becomes part of the Republic of Cameroon.
 1963 - Centre Culturel Americain active.
 1964 - Centre Culturel Francais active.
 1965 - Pan African Institute for Development regional headquarters established in Douala.
 1970 - Population: 250,000 urban agglomeration.
 1972
 Stade de la Réunification built.
 February–March: City hosts 1972 African Cup of Nations.
 1974
 Commune Urbaine de Douala (urban council) established.
 Cameroon Tribune newspaper begins publication.
 1978 - American School founded.
 1979 - Le Messager newspaper begins publication.
 1983 - Population: 708,000 urban agglomeration (estimate).
 1986 -  (museum) founded.
 1987 -  created.
 1990 - Population: 931,000 (urban agglomeration).
 1991
 General strike.
 Doual'art (art centre) founded.
 1992 - Commune Urbaine d`Arrondissement Douala V created.
 1993 - University of Douala founded.
 1997 - Commercial Bank Cameroon and Commercial Bank Group headquartered in city.
 1999 - Festival International de Voix de Femmes begins (women's fest).
 2000 - Population: 1,432,000 (urban agglomeration).

21st century

 2001 
 9 April: Political protest.
 Douala Stock Exchange and Accueil Femmes Francophones de Douala founded.
 2002
 World Bank Douala Infrastructure Project launched.
 Astres Football Club formed.
 2004 - March: Taxi strike.
 2005
 City website online (approximate date).
 Art biennale begins.
 Population: 1,907,479.
 2007
 Salon Urbain de Douala (art fair) begins.
 5 May: Airplane crash near city.
 2008
 February: Anti-government protest.
 City becomes capital of Littoral Region (Cameroon).
 2010 - Drinking water shortage.
 2016 - Population: 2,948,464 (estimate).
 2019 - Part of 2019 Africa Cup of Nations football contest to be played in Douala.

See also
 Douala history (fr)
 
 Timeline of Yaoundé

References

This article incorporates information from the French Wikipedia and the German Wikipedia.

Bibliography

in English

in French

in German

External links

  (Bibliography of open access  articles)
  (Images, etc.)
  (Images, etc.)
  (Bibliography)
  (Bibliography)
  (Bibliography)
 University of Southern California. Old photos of Douala, various dates
 German Federal Archives. Photos of Douala

Douala
Douala
Cameroon history-related lists
Years in Cameroon